Nathan Ward (born December 8, 1981 in Edmonton, Alberta) is a Canadian former professional ice hockey player.

Career
Ward's senior level career began with his move into the NCAA for Lake Superior State University (LSSU). Ward established himself quickly, and in his first season managed to score 10 points in 38 games.

Ward would continue to be a key player for LSSU, and in the following three seasons totaled 54 points, missing only a handful of games. After Ward had finished playing for LSSU, he moved to sign for the Odessa Jackalopes in the Central Hockey League. Despite it being Ward's first professional hockey season, he averaged almost a point every two games. This productivity persuaded the Jackalopes to re-sign Ward for the 2007-08 term. Ward would improve again, this time managing 63 points in 64 games, and helping the Jackalopes into the post-season.

In the summer of 2008, Ward took the decision to play his hockey outside North America for the first time, signing with the Manchester Phoenix to play under head coach Tony Hand. Ward moved to Manchester in July 2008 along with his Jackalopes teammate Alex Dunn. A successful season would follow in Manchester, with the organisation reaching both domestic cup finals and making the play-offs. Ward was key to the success, proving himself as a play-maker and goal-scorer. Despite the team's on-ice improvement, financial problems continued and the Phoenix moved into the EPL at the end of the season. This would considerably limit the budget available, and consequently much of the senior squad, including Ward, was released and signed on September 25, 2009 by Flint Generals.

Career stats

References

External links

Nathan Ward Personal Profile, Manchester Phoenix Official Website
 http://www.eliteprospects.com/player.php?player=252722

1981 births
Canadian ice hockey centres
Ice hockey people from Alberta
Lake Superior State Lakers men's ice hockey players
Living people
Manchester Phoenix players
Odessa Jackalopes players
Canadian expatriate ice hockey players in England